Acacia schinoides is a shrub or tree indigenous to Australia. It has also been introduced into Kenya and Zimbabwe and it is cultivated there. A common name for the plant in Australia is green cedar wattle.

Description
Acacia schinoides grows to a height of   In summer it bears cream-colored, ball-shaped flowers. It is a, "Fast-growing tree in well-composted soil."

Uses
The shrub makes a good garden hedge.

Natural growing conditions
Acacia schinoides can withstand frosts as low as −7 °C.  It does well in both shade and sun.

References

Bibliography

schinoides
Flora of New South Wales